Greenwood is an unincorporated community located in Mitchell County, Georgia, United States.

History
Greenwood was laid out about 1880 and named for the live oak trees near the original town site.

Geography
Greenwood sits on the intersection of Ga Highway 97 and Greenwood Road. Fox Run Road, Kurbo Lane, Pipeline Road, Sassafras Tea Road, Richards Lane, and Flats Road also rest in the area.

Greenwood's latitude is at 31.198 and its longitude is at -84.34. Its elevation rests at 151 feet. Greenwood appears on the Branchville U.S. Geological Survey Map.

Churches
The Greenwood Free Will Baptist Church sits in the area as well as the Anitoch Baptist Church.

References 

Unincorporated communities in Georgia (U.S. state)
Unincorporated communities in Mitchell County, Georgia